{{Infobox comic book title
|title = Detective Comics #27'
|image = Detective Comics 27 (May 1939).png
|caption = Cover of Detective Comics #27 (May 1939) by Bob Kane 
|genre = 
|publisher = DC Comics
|date = March 30, 1939 (on sale)May 1939 (cover date)
}}'Detective Comics #27' is an American comic book of the Detective Comics anthology series known for debuting the superhero Batman in a featured story called "The Case of the Chemical Syndicate" during the Golden Age of Comic Books. It is considered one of the most important and valuable first appearance debuts from DC Comics alongside Action Comics #1, released the previous year.

 "The Case of the Chemical Syndicate"  
 Plot 
A man named Lambert has been stabbed to death, and his son's fingerprints have been found on the knife. Commissioner Gordon goes to the crime scene, taking his young, wealthy socialite friend, Bruce Wayne with him. Gordon interviews Lambert Jr., who says that someone else had murdered his father and that his fingerprints got on the knife as he was pulling it out of his father's back. He also says that his father had three other business partners: Steven Crane, Alfred Stryker and Paul Rogers.

Just then, Steven Crane calls and speaks with Commissioner Gordon, telling him that Lambert had received an anonymous death threat the previous day, and that he has received another one today and is now fearing for his life. Wayne leaves, saying that he is going home. The police go to Crane's house but are too late, as he has already been shot dead.

Crane's murderer meets his accomplice and shows him the contract he stole. Suddenly, a dark, terrifying masked figure dubbed "the Bat-Man" looms over them before he defeats the two criminals and proceeds to investigate the contract.

Later, Paul Rogers goes to Alfred Stryker's house after hearing about the murders on the radio. Stryker's assistant, Jennings, forces Rogers into a makeshift gas chamber in order to kill him. The Bat-Man arrives, saves Rogers and defeats Jennings. Stryker then arrives, reveals himself to be the mastermind behind Lambert and Crane's murders, and attacks Rogers, but the Bat-Man subdues him too.

The Bat-Man then reveals that Stryker wanted total control over the Apex Chemical Corporation without having to pay for it and that he, in order to obtain it, had hired the murderers to kill his business partners and steal the secret contracts he had with them. Stryker tears free and tries to shoot the Bat-Man who, in turn, punches Stryker, knocking him into an acid tank where he is killed instantly. The Bat-Man says "A fitting end for his kind", before disappearing through an open skylight.

The next day, Commissioner Gordon talks to Wayne and tells him about the Bat-Man's caper. Wayne acts incredulous and goes home, where it is revealed to the reader that he is in fact the Bat-Man.

 Reprints and remakes  
As well as being printed in Detective Comics #27, "The Case of the Chemical Syndicate" has been reprinted in:
 Detective Comics #387
 Detective Comics #627
 Famous First Edition C-28
 Millennium Edition:Detective Comics #27
 Batman Archives Vol. 1
 Batman Chronicles Vol. 1
 Batman: From The 30's to the 70's

Due to holding a special place as Batman’s first published adventure, “The Case of the Chemical Syndicate” has been remade several times. In 1969, the thirtieth anniversary of the story, a contemporary update written by Mike Friedrich was published in Detective Comics #387 with art by Bob Brown and Joe Giella. Titled “The Cry of Night is -- Sudden Death!”, it updated the setting to a contemporary one and introduced an element of generational gap, playing on a small aspect of the original in which the victim’s son was suspected of the crime.

Another remake was included in Secret Origins #6 (1986) by Roy Thomas and Marshall Rogers, more closely mirroring the original’s plot, with updated art.Detective Comics #627 was a special issue that included four different versions of the story: the 1939 original, the 1969 update (retitled "The Cry of Night is -- Kill!"), and two new takes on the story, one by Marv Wolfman and Jim Aparo, and another by Alan Grant and Norm Breyfogle.

Brad Meltzer wrote an updated version of this story with art by Bryan Hitch for The New 52s Detective Comics volume 2 #27 which was released in January 2014 as part of Batman's 75th anniversary. The plot and characters are largely the same as the original, with a twist ending implying Stryker becomes the Joker after falling into the vat of acid.

Legacy
Though not being the first of the Detective Comics series, the issue is considered a landmark as the first appearance of Batman. Originally starting out of an anthology series focusing on original crime series stories, the iconic superhero known as Batman would be introduced by Bob Kane and Bill Finger to National Comics Publications (now DC Comics) with inspiration to create a new Superman that first appeared in Action Comics #1. Due to the character being a household name, the original comic has endured as one of the most valuable comic books of all time alongside the likes of Action Comics #1 and Spider-Man's first appearance in Amazing Fantasy'' #15. The comic book is cited to be very rare to find in mint condition in comic book collecting.

See also 
 Batman comic book
 The Man Behind the Red Hood!

References

External links 
 Detective Comics #27 at the DC Comics Database

1939 in comics
Individual issues of comic series